Chantal Groot (born 19 October 1982) is a butterfly and freestyle swimmer from the Netherlands, who has represented her country in many international championships since 1999. The best distance of Chantal Groot is the 50 m butterfly in which she won five European LC Championships medals, for the first time in 1999 in Istanbul, and became European Champion in 2008 in Eindhoven.

Swimming career 
After winning a gold and a silver medal at the European Junior Swimming Championships 1998 in Antwerp she made her international debut at the 1999 FINA Short Course World Championships in Hong Kong. Groot immediately won her first international medal, a silver, in the 4×100 m freestyle relay together with Thamar Henneken, Wilma van Hofwegen and Inge de Bruijn. Individually she finished 14th in the 100 m butterfly. A few months later she competed in the 1999 European Aquatics Championships in Istanbul. In the 50 m butterfly she won her first individual medal, at the age of 17, reaching third place behind Anna-Karin Kammerling and Johanna Sjöberg. Chantal also reached the final of the 50 m freestyle ending up 7th. In the 4×100 m freestyle she finished fourth with the team.

2000 
In 2000, she competed in the 2000 FINA Short Course World Championships in Athens where an 11th place in the 50 m butterfly was her best result. At the 2000 European Aquatics Championships in Helsinki she was in the finals of all three relay events but did not won a medal. Individually a 7th place in the 100 m butterfly was her best performance. Groot was also selected to take part in the 2000 Summer Olympics in Sydney. She swam in the heats of the 4×100 m freestyle but was replaced for the final by Inge de Bruijn, but still received a silver medal for her efforts in the heats. Individually she reached the semi-finals of the 100 m butterfly ending up 11th. In the two other relays there was no success.

Post Sydney Olympics 
The 2001 World Aquatics Championships and the 2002 FINA Short Course World Championships were not successful for Groot.
At the 2002 European Aquatics Championships in Berlin she won a bronze medal in the 50 m butterfly. She won also a bronze medal in the 4×100 m freestyle relay together with Manon van Rooijen, Marleen Veldhuis and Wilma van Hofwegen. In December 2002 she won two bronze medals at the European Short Course Swimming Championships 2002 in the 4×50 m freestyle and 4×50 m medley relay. In 2003, she started at the 2003 World Aquatics Championships in Barcelona where she finished 4th in the 4×100 m freestyle, 5th in the 50 m butterfly and 6th with the medley relay. In Dublin in December she won the gold medal in the 4×50 m freestyle and the bronze medal in the 4×50 m medley relay at the European Short Course Swimming Championships 2003.

Road to Athens/2004 Olympics
2004 started for Groot with the 2004 European Aquatics Championships in Madrid where she achieved to win three medals, silver in the 4×100 m freestyle alongside Inge Dekker, Annabel Kosten and Marleen Veldhuis. There was a bronze medal in the 50 m butterfly and another bronze in the 4×100 m medley together with Stefanie Luiken, Madelon Baans and Marleen Veldhuis. After this tournament she prepared to compete at the 2004 Summer Olympics in Athens, Greece, where she was on the team that captured the bronze medal in the 4×100 m freestyle relay, alongside Inge de Bruijn, Marleen Veldhuis, and Inge Dekker.

2004 post-Olympic tournaments 
Two months after the Olympics she competed in the 2004 FINA Short Course World Championships in Indianapolis, Indiana. During this tournament she ended 7th in both 100 m butterfly and 100 m freestyle. In December she captured her second European title in the 4×50 m freestyle relay at the European Short Course Swimming Championships 2004 in Vienna and finished 7th again in the 100 m freestyle.

2005-2007 
2005 wasn't a fantastic for Groot with a 4th place in the 4×100 m freestyle and 9th in the 50 m butterfly during the 2005 World Aquatics Championships in Montreal, Quebec, Canada. At the end of the year she won the gold medal for the third time in a row in the 4×50 m freestyle at the European Short Course Swimming Championships 2005. 2006 started off with the 2006 FINA Short Course World Championships in Shanghai. Together with Inge Dekker, Hinkelien Schreuder and Marleen Veldhuis, Groot set a world record and won a gold medal in the 4×100 m freestyle relay in a time of 3:33.32. In the summer she took part in the 2006 European Aquatics Championships in Budapest, Hungary where she added a silver medal, in the 4×100 m freestyle with Dekker, Veldhuis and Ranomi Kromowidjojo, and a bronze medal, fourth time in her career, in the 50 m butterfly to her impressive collection of medals. In Helsinki she won a silver medal in the 4×50 m freestyle at the European Short Course Swimming Championships 2006. Her next big tournament was the 2007 World Aquatics Championships in Melbourne, Australia where she was swum out of the 4×100 m freestyle team by teammate Femke Heemskerk while being a regular team member in the finals for so many years. Individually she ended 13th and 20th in the 50 m and 100 m butterfly making it a disappointing tournament for Groot. A fifth spot at the European Short Course Swimming Championships 2007 was her best result of a disappointing year.

2008 
In March 2008 Groot competed in her home country at the 2008 European Aquatics Championships where she finally became European Champion in the 50 m butterfly beating teammate Inge Dekker in the final, after having won the bronze medal four times in this event. In the 100 m butterfly she finished up 5th and qualified for the 2008 Summer Olympics. She started in the heats of the 4×100 m freestyle and 4×100 m medley but was replaced for the finals each time. In the second week of April she participated in the 2008 FINA Short Course World Championships in Manchester. She started individually in the 100 m butterfly and reached a 6th place. She also swam in the heats of the 4×100 m medley but was replaced in the final by Inge Dekker. The Olympic Games in Beijing were a disappointment because she ended 30th in the 100 m butterfly.

Personal bests

See also
List of Dutch records in swimming

References

1982 births
Living people
Dutch female freestyle swimmers
Dutch female butterfly swimmers
Olympic swimmers of the Netherlands
Swimmers at the 2000 Summer Olympics
Swimmers at the 2004 Summer Olympics
Swimmers at the 2008 Summer Olympics
Olympic silver medalists for the Netherlands
Olympic bronze medalists for the Netherlands
Swimmers from Amsterdam
World record setters in swimming
Olympic bronze medalists in swimming
Medalists at the FINA World Swimming Championships (25 m)
European Aquatics Championships medalists in swimming
Medalists at the 2000 Summer Olympics
Medalists at the 2004 Summer Olympics
Olympic silver medalists in swimming
21st-century Dutch women